Symplocos sousae is a species of plant in the family Symplocaceae. It is found in Costa Rica and Mexico.

References

sousae
Data deficient plants
Taxonomy articles created by Polbot